Reilhac is a commune in the Cantal department in south-central France.

Population

Administration

List of mayors from the French Revolution to the Liberation (1790-1944)

List of mayors since the Liberation (1944-Today)

See also
Communes of the Cantal department

References

Communes of Cantal
Cantal communes articles needing translation from French Wikipedia